Moscow Automobile and Road Construction State Technical University is a public university located in Moscow, Russia. It was founded in 1930.

History
The Moscow State Automobile and Road Technical University (MADI) was established by a decree of the USSR Council of People's Commissars in 1930 on the basis of the Automobile Department of the Moscow Institute of Transport Engineers and the Higher School of Roads. At the time of its organization MADI had two faculties - road construction and automobile engineering. In 1931 the first graduation of 36 engineers took place.

In November 1987 on the basis of MADI was organized by the Educational and Methodical Association on motor and road specialties, which united 104 universities in 9 specialties and 9 specializations.

Since 1992 it has the status of a technical university keeping its traditional name. Scientific and pedagogical work was carried out by more than 800 professors and teachers, including about 100 doctors and about 500 candidates of sciences.

Since 2010 the Institute bears the new name - Moscow Automobile and Road State Technical University (MADI).

The university has four branches: Bronnitsky (1996, Bronnitsy, Moscow Region), Volzhsky (2000, Cheboksary, Chuvash Republic), Makhachkala (1998, Makhachkala, Republic of Dagestan) and North Caucasian branch (2005, Lermontov, Stavropol Territory).

The university has a number of research institutes. Among which it can be noted the Institute of energy and ecological problems of road transport complex, Institute of problems of road transport, Institute of materials and constructions, Institute of technology, standardization and certification of road-building materials.

The university educates students in 32 specialties and 9 bachelor's degree programs. Categories of graduates - bachelors, masters, engineers, managers. MADI maintains ties with road maintenance structures in Moscow and the regions. There are about 9000 students studying at the university.

Structure
 Faculty of Road and Technological Machines
 Faculty of automobile transport
 Faculty of energy and ecology
 Road construction faculty
 Faculty of Economics
 Faculty of Management
 Faculty of logistics and general transport problems
 Faculty of engineering and mechanics
 Pre-University Faculty
 Preparatory faculty for foreign citizens
 Correspondence faculty

Notes and references

Universities in Moscow
Technical universities and colleges in Russia